Lee Willard Edwards (born 1932) is an American academic and author, currently a fellow at The Heritage Foundation. He is a historian of the conservative movement in America.

Background
Edwards was born in Chicago in 1932. Edwards says he was influenced by the politics of his parents, both anti-communist. His father Willard was a journalist for the Chicago Tribune.

He holds a bachelor's degree in English from Duke University and a doctorate in political science from Catholic University. His dissertation was entitled Congress and the origins of the Cold War, 1946–1948.

Career

Edwards helped found Young Americans for Freedom (YAF) in 1960, and then worked for the YAF magazine New Guard as editor. In 1963, he became news director of the Draft Goldwater Committee.

His publications include biographies of Ronald Reagan, William F. Buckley, Edwin Meese III and Goldwater, and a work of history, The Conservative Revolution: The Movement That Remade America and The Power of Ideas.
He acted as senior editor for the World & I, owned by a subsidiary of Sun Myung Moon's Unification Church.

Edwards was the founding director of the Institute on Political Journalism at Georgetown University and a fellow at the Harvard Institute of Politics. He is a past president of the Philadelphia Society and has been a media fellow at the Hoover Institution.

Edwards co-founded the Victims of Communism Memorial Foundation with the Heritage Foundation's founder and chairman, Edwin Feulner, and was appointed its chairman emeritus. Edwards is a signatory of the Prague Declaration on European Conscience and Communism.

Personal
He and his wife, Anne, who assists him in all his writing, live in Alexandria, Virginia. They have two daughters and eleven grandchildren.

References

External links
 The Lee Edwards papers at the Hoover Institution Archives.
 with Lee Edwards by Stephen McKiernan, Binghamton University Libraries Center for the Study of the 1960s
 

1932 births
Living people
Catholic University of America alumni
Catholic University of America School of Arts and Sciences faculty
Duke University Trinity College of Arts and Sciences alumni
Georgetown University faculty
The Heritage Foundation
American anti-communists
Illinois Republicans
Harvard Kennedy School staff
University of Paris alumni
Virginia Republicans
People from Alexandria, Virginia
American expatriates in France